The Battle of Vaikal occurred in April 1465 in the valley of Vaikal, southeastern Albania. A new Ottoman sanjakbey of the Sanjak of Ohrid, Ballaban Badera (of Albanian origin), was sent by Sultan Mehmed II to inflict heavy losses on the Albanian forces. Skanderbeg had been prepared for the battle and prepared his troops for a plan of action. This worked well until some of Skanderbeg's officers did not follow orders to stop chasing the Ottoman forces and were captured along with their men. The officers were sent back to Constantinople where they were tortured and executed and their bodies were thrown to the dogs.

Background and prelude

The Sultan Mehmed II gave Ballaban Badera, who was a sanjakbey of the Sanjak of Ohrid, the reins of the Ottoman campaigns in Albania. Ballaban had been a peasant in Skanderbeg's paternal domains who was raised through the devsirme to become a Janissary for the Sultan, much like Skanderbeg.

Ballaban was wary of his own defeat so he presented Skanderbeg with a series of gifts so that if the Ottoman commander was captured, the Albanian chieftain would have enough mercy to spare him. Ballaban had known Skanderbeg when they were both in the Ottoman court, but the former had always held great animosity towards the latter. Ballaban always tried to come off as Skanderbeg's personal friend and ally, but he was always ready for the moment to assault him. Once he learned that Skanderbeg had been camped in Vaikal with 4,500 men, Ballaban began his campaign to defeat Skanderbeg.

Battle-plan

Skanderbeg had been waiting for an Ottoman assault and exhorted to his troops to constantly be prepared. The day before the battle, he explained the warriors' plan of action. He planned to trick the Ottomans into thinking that his forces were too weak and too frightened to fight. When the Ottomans were finally lured into both the valley and a false sense of security, the Albanian warriors would pounce on them. The Ottoman forces would then be chased all the way up to the hills and the Albanians would stop there to avoid a counterattack.

Battle

The next day Ballaban came past the hills but, unexpectedly, charged at Skanderbeg's forces with great speed and fury. Skanderbeg allowed them to get near him and then he launched his own counterattack. A bloody battle soon followed with heavy casualties on both sides, but the Albanians managed to hold their ground and soon, the frightened Ottoman soldiers began to flee. As commanded, the Albanians pursued them up to the hills before many of the forces halted. The Albanians held the ground in the end, but it had come at a very great cost. Some of Skanderbeg's most trusted men were captured in this battle, including: Moisi Gjurica; Muzaka of Angelina; Gjin Muzaka; Gjon Perlati; Nikollë Berisha; Gjergj Kuka; Gjin Maneshi. These men were overcome by the heat of the battle and did not follow Skanderbeg's orders to stay below the hills and were captured by the reformed Ottoman forces. The Turks hid and ambushed the Albanian officers and their companions. The Turkish cavalry regained its confidence and they climbed on top of a high point where the infantry was stationed. Ballaban, however, was content with his soldiers' achievements and marched back to Constantinople with the captured captains.

Aftermath

Skanderbeg sent an ambassador to the Sultan to beg him to return his officers unharmed or else he would execute his own prisoners of war. The Sultan was not moved. He ordered a fifteen-day torture of the Albanian officers. Mehmed ordered Ballaban to continue his campaigns against Albania. Ballaban invaded Albania again, only to be soundly defeated.

Notes

References
Franco, Demetrio. Comentario de le cose de' Turchi, et del S. Georgio Scanderbeg, principe d' Epyr. Venice: Altobello Salkato, 1480.
 

Vaikal
Vaikal
1465 in Europe
Vaikal
Vaikal
1460s in the Ottoman Empire